Voss is a Norwegian-based bottled water from the village of Vatnestrøm in Iveland municipality, Agder county. It is available in both still and sparkling forms.

The company's cylindrical glass bottle was designed by Neil Kraft. In some countries including US, UK and Australia, VOSS still water is also packaged in plastic bottles that retain the cylindrical design.

Company history

Development
Voss is bottled by Voss of Norway AS, an American Limited Company headquartered in New York City. The water is marketed in over 50 countries, with a particular focus on the United States. Voss claims its manufacturing process is completely carbon neutral.

Recognition
In 2007, Women's Health magazine rated Voss #1 among several bottled waters. For entertainment on television, in tests sponsored by Finland's national broadcasting company, Yle, three blindfolded wine experts rated Voss water lowest of six waters tested, which included Helsinki public tap water.

Leadership
In 2016, Reignwood Group, a Thai-Chinese company, acquired majority control of Voss.  The chairwoman of Voss is Lisa Wang and the vice chairman is John D. Shulman.

Bottling source controversy
In October 2010, Norway's TV 2 reported that Voss has the same source as tap water from the municipal water supply in Iveland and, contrary to Voss marketing, that this is not artesian. TV 2 stood by these claims despite Voss's objections.

References

External links
 Voss—Official site

Bottled water brands

Carbonated water